Lucius O. Croxton (1908–1978) was an American art director.  He designed the film sets on a number of Hollywood productions, working for studios such as RKO and Monogram Pictures. He is sometimes credited simply as Lucius Croxton.

Selected filmography
 Nevada (1944)
 The Falcon in Hollywood (1944)
 What a Blonde (1945)
 The Falcon's Alibi (1946)
 The Bamboo Blonde (1946)
 Vacation in Reno (1946)
 San Quentin (1946)
 Beat the Band (1947)
 Code of the West (1947)
 Dick Tracy's Dilemma (1947)
 Seven Keys to Baldpate (1947)
 Wild Horse Mesa (1947)
 Belle Starr's Daughter (1948)
 Michael O'Halloran (1948)
 Roughshod (1949)
 Massacre River (1949)
 The Boy from Indiana (1950)
 Fort Defiance (1951)
 Shack Out on 101 (1955)
 Muscle Beach Party (1964)

References

Bibliography
 Basinger, Jeanine . Anthony Mann. Wesleyan University Press,  2007.
 Lentz, Robert J. Gloria Grahame, Bad Girl of Film Noir: The Complete Career. McFarland, 1981.

External links

1908 births
1978 deaths
American art directors
People from New York (state)